Prey Tralach is a khum (commune) of Rukhak Kiri District in Battambang Province in north-western Cambodia.

Before January 9, 2009, it was in Moung Ruessei District, Battambang Province.

Villages

 Sdok Pravoek
 Prey Tralach
 Kos Thom
 Srah Kuy
 Muk Ra
 Svay Yar
 Toul Svay
 Prah Andong
 Toul Koki
 Prey Khloat
 Pen
 Chung Por
 Roong
 Ta Preat

References

Communes of Battambang province
Moung Ruessei District